Benjamin Becker was the defending champion, but he was defeated in the semifinals against Janko Tipsarević.Sergiy Stakhovsky won in the final 6–3, 6–0 against Tipsarević.

Seeds

Draw

Finals

Top half

Bottom half

References
Main Draw
Qualifying Draw

UNICEF Open - Men's Singles
Rosmalen Grass Court Championships